Reverend Doctor Margaret Jane Joachim  (born 25 June 1949) is a British former Liberal Party and current Liberal Democrat politician who was chair of the Women's Liberal Democrats.

Background
Joachim was the daughter of Reginald and Joyce Margaret Carpenter. She was educated at Brighton and Hove High School, St Hugh's College, Oxford (MA Geology) and the University of Birmingham (PhD Geology). In 1970 she married Paul Joseph Joachim. They had one daughter.

Political career
Joachim was Liberal candidate for the West Gloucestershire at the 1979 General Election, finishing third. She was Liberal candidate for the Finchley (the seat of the then Conservative Prime Minister Margaret Thatcher) at the 1983 General Election, finishing third. She was Liberal candidate for the Epsom and Ewell at the 1987 General Election, finishing second. She did not stand for parliament again.

She was training officer for the Liberal Parliamentary Association from 1979 to 1984. She was a member of the executive of the Women's Liberal Federation from 1984 to 1985. She was chair of the Women's Liberal Democrats from 1989 to 1990 and vice-chair from 1990 to 1992. She was chair of the Liberal Democrats London Region Candidates’ Committee from 2007 to 2010 and chair of the Liberal Democrats English Candidates’ Committee from 2011 to 2013.

Joachim was appointed Member of the Order of the British Empire (MBE) in the 2023 New Year Honours for services to women in politics.

Arms
Paul Joachim died before 3 May 2019. Margaret matriculated arms on his behalf.

Electoral record

References

1949 births
Living people
Liberal Party (UK) parliamentary candidates
People educated at Brighton and Hove High School
Alumni of the University of Birmingham
Alumni of St Hugh's College, Oxford
Members of the Order of the British Empire